Dikenli can refer to:

 Dikenli, Çerkeş
 Dikenli, Dodurga
 Dikenli, Korgun